A Line That Connects is the tenth studio album by Lycia, released by Handmade Birds on August 21, 2015.

Track listing

Personnel 
Adapted from the A Line That Connects liner notes.

Lycia
 David Galas – electric guitar, acoustic guitar, synthesizer, drum programming, mixing, lead vocals (7, 13)
 Mike VanPortfleet – lead vocals, electric guitar, acoustic guitar, synthesizer
 Tara VanFlower – lead vocals
Additional musicians
 Michael Irwin – backing vocals (11)
 Sera Timms – backing vocals (12)

Production and additional personnel
 Lycia – production, recording
 James Plotkin – mastering
 David "Slaya" Smith – photography

Release history

References

External links 
 
 A Line That Connects at Bandcamp
 A Line That Connects at iTunes

2015 albums
Lycia (band) albums